West Bengal celebrates many holidays and festivals. The Bengali proverb “Baro Mase Tero Parbon” (“Thirteen festivals in twelve months”) indicates the abundance of festivities in the state. Throughout the Bengali calendar, many festivals are celebrated. Durga Puja is solemnized as perhaps the most significant of all celebrations in West Bengal. Here is a list of the main festivals of West Bengal.

Main Festivals 
Kalpataru Utsab কল্পতরু উৎসব - January 1 of every year is celebrated as Kalpataru Day at Dakshineshwar and Kossipore Uddyanbati.
21 February - Bengali language Day ভাষা দিবস
Poila Boishakh নববর্ষ 
Guru Purnima গুরু পূর্ণিমা
Bhai Phonta ভাই ফোঁটা
Kali Puja কালি পূজা
Lakshmi Puja লক্ষী পূজা
Dolyatra দোলযাত্রা
Eid-ul-Fitr রোজার ঈদ
Eid-ul-Adha বকরী ঈদ
Ganesh Chaturthi গণেশ চতুর্থী

Gaura Purnima গৌর পূর্ণিমা
Vishwakarma Puja বিশ্বকর্মা পূজা
Durga Puja দুর্গাপূজা
Indian Independence Day স্বাধীনতা দিবস
Jagadhhatri Puja জগদ্ধাত্রী পূজা
Janmashtami জন্মাষ্টমী
Nandotsav নন্দ উৎসব 
Nazrul Jayanti নজরুল জয়ন্তী
Maghotsav of Brahmo Samaj মাঘ উৎসব
Mahalaya মহালয়া
May Day মে দিবস
Muharram মহরম
Paush Parban পৌষ পার্বন
Poila Falgun পয়েলা ফাল্গুন
Rabindra Jayanti রবীন্দ্র জয়ন্তী
Death Anniversary of Rabindranath Tagore রবীন্দ্রনাথের মৃত্যু দিবস
Sri Ramakrishna Jayanti রামকৃষ্ণ জয়ন্তী
Rathayatra রথ যাত্ৰা
Rakhi Bandhan রাখি বন্ধন
26 January- Republic Day প্রজাতন্ত্র দিবস
Saraswati Puja সরস্বতী পূজা
Kojagari Lakhsmi Puja কোজাগরী
Shivaratri শিবরাত্রি
Birthday of Netaji নেতাজী জয়ন্তী
Birthday of Swami Vivekananda বিবেকানন্দ জয়ন্তী
Ramnavami রাম নবমী
Raasjatra রাস যাত্রা
Jhulanjatra ঝুলন যাত্রা
Christmas  বড়ো দিন

Other Festivals 
Akshay Tritiya
Bhadu
Gandheswari Puja
Guptipara Rathayatra
Nabanna
Shakta Rash
Buddha Purnima
Jamai Shasthi
Death Anniversary of Lokenath Brahmachari
Ganga Dussehra
Gangasagar fair and pilgrimage
Snana Yatra
Bipattarini Brata
Jhulan Yatra
Bhadrotsav of Brahmo Samaj
Viswakarma Puja
Annakut Utsab
Kartik Puja
Itu Puja
Basanti Puja
Charak Puja
Rathayatra of Mahesh
Gajan
Good Friday
Basanta Utsav

References

 
West Bengal
Lists of tourist attractions in West Bengal